This is a list of members of the Australian Senate from 1983 to 1985. It consisted of ten senators for each of the six states of Australia and two senators representing each of the Northern Territory and the Australian Capital Territory. All members were elected at the 1983 election following a double dissolution of both houses of parliament, rather than the normal case of only half of the state senators facing election.

In accordance with section 13 of the Constitution, following a double dissolution of Parliament, the terms for senators commence on 1 July preceding the election – i.e., on 1 July 1982.  The first five senators elected in each state were allocated the full six-year terms ending on 30 June 1988 while the other half were allocated three-year terms ending on 30 June 1985. Senators took their seats immediately following the election on 5 March 1983.  The four territory senators were elected in March 1983 and their terms ended at the dissolution of the House of Representatives, which was December 1984.

Notes

References

Members of Australian parliaments by term
20th-century Australian politicians
Australian Senate lists